Experimental Brain Research is a peer-reviewed scientific journal covering research in neuroscience. The journal was established in 1966 and is published by Springer Science+Business Media. According to the Journal Citation Reports, the journal has a 2020 5-year impact factor of 2.166.

References

External links 
 

Neuroscience journals
English-language journals
Springer Science+Business Media academic journals
Publications established in 1966
Monthly journals